The Sanquianga River  is a river in the west of Colombia that flows into the Pacific Ocean.

Course

The river flows through the Nariño Department.

Climate

The most rain falls in June and July. November is the driest month.

Delta

There is a large river delta at the mouth of the Sanquianga that feeds an area of Esmeraldes-Pacific Colombia mangroves with water relatively high in sediment.
The mangrove trees have a canopy that reaches  in height.
Sanquianga National Natural Park covers an area of the river delta which is periodically flooded by the action of the tides and rivers.
The Pacific tides carry the influence of the sea waters many kilometers into the interior of the low coastal plain.

See also
List of rivers of Colombia

References

Sources

Rivers of Colombia